Mistress is a 2018 South Korean television series based on the 2008–10 U.K. series of the same name. It stars Han Ga-in, Shin Hyun-been, Choi Hee-seo and Goo Jae-yee. The series aired on OCN from April 28 to June 3, 2018 on Saturdays and Sundays at 22:20 (KST).

Synopsis
Revolves around the story of four women in their 30s and their complex relationships - each on her own path to self-discovery as they brave the turbulent journey together.

The movie starts with Se-Yeon (Han Ga-In), Eun-Soo (Shin Hyun-Been), Jung-Won (Choi Hee-Seo) and Hwa-Young (Goo Jae-Yee) who have a dead man's body in front of them. Se-Yeon has three close friends: Eun-Soo, Jung-Won and Hwa-Young.

2 months prior, Se-Yeon runs a cafe. She has a daughter, whom she loves very much. Her husband died 2 years earlier, but his body was never found. She then receives a phone call without a caller ID number. The caller plays a song that was her husband's favorite song, unnerving her. Song-Hoon (Lee Hee-Joon), a divorced father whose daughter attends the same kindergarten as Se-Yeon's daughter, tries to initiate a romantic relationship with her. Se-Yeon's friends encourage her to pursue this relationship.

Eun-Soo works as a psychiatrist. One day, her patient Sun-Ho (Jung Ga-Ram) tells her that he is looking for his dead father's mistress. He believes that the mistress killed his father. Sun-Ho vows to kill this mistress, hinting that he is aware of Eun-Soo's relationship with his late father. Eun-Soo does not tell her client that she is the one who had the secret affair with his father, nor that she was the one who found his dead body. Eun-Soo also has another secret.

Jung-Won is a high school teacher. She is married to famous chef Dong-Seok (Park Byung-Eun). He seems like the perfect husband. Dong-Seok wants to have a child badly, but Jung-Won doesn't know the real reason why her husband wants a child. Dong-Seok continuously tracks Jung-Won's ovulation. Meanwhile, Min-Gyu (Ji Il-Joo) is a temporary teacher at the same high school where Jung-Won teaches. Min-Gyu ultimately blackmails her after seeing her leave a motel, knowing it will cause the vice principal at her school to fire her, however, Min-Gyu has an ulterior motive.

Hwa-Young works as an office administrator at a law firm. She enjoys her single life and she doesn't want to be tied down with one man. One day, a female client comes and requests that someone secretly follow her husband Tae-O (Kim Min-Soo). Hwa-Young takes this task but realizes that the man is Hwa-Young's ex-boyfriend.

Cast

Main
 Han Ga-in as Jang Se-yeon
 Owner of a cafe shop. A widow who lives alone with her daughter. She is sympathetic, nurturing, and often puts other needs ahead of her own. 
 Shin Hyun-been as Kim Eun-soo
 A psychiatrist. After her paramour's death, she meets a patient named Sun-ho who happens to be the son of her ex-lover. She is able to hide her emotions very well, except for a nervous tick, which heightens her level of anxiety.
 Choi Hee-seo as Han Jung-won
 A high school teacher and wife of a famous chef. She dreams of a perfect home but is stressed due to pregnancy issues. She is hot-tempered, and mostly driven by her emotions. 
 Goo Jae-yee as Do Hwa-young
 A law firm secretary who lives to fulfill her ambitions. She has a carefree attitude, which can sometimes come off as insensitive. She wants to live her life man-free, but is continuously reminded of her past.

Supporting
 Lee Hee-joon as Han Sang-hoon
 A complex man who stayed close to Se-yeon's side and takes care of her, but hides a dark secret. 
 Jung Ga-ram as Cha Sun-ho
 Son of Cha Min-jae. 
 Park Byung-eun as Hwang Dong-seok
 Jung-won's husband. Chef of a popular cooking program.
 Ji Il-joo as Kwon Min-gyu
 A teacher. He is bold and honest, and gets along with his students.
 Oh Jung-se as Kim Young-dae
 Se-yeon's deceased husband. He was a sweet and caring man, who died when he left on a business trip to China.  
  as Yang Jin-gun
 A divorce specialist who is also a Casanova, but he doesn't believe in love. Do Hwa-young's partner in work.
  as Cha Min-jae
 Sun-ho's father. Eun-soo's lover. 
 Jang Hee-jung as Baek Jae-hee
  as Kang Tae-oh
 Lee Sang-hee as Park Jung-sim
 Kim Ho-jung as Na Yoon-jung
 Choi Yu-hwa as Jin Hye-rim
 Joo Ye-rim as Jang Se-yeon's daughter

Special appearance
 Lee Ha-na (Ep. 12)

Production
The first script reading was held on March 15, 2018 at Studio Dragon's main office in Sangam-dong, Seoul, South Korea.

Ratings

References

External links
  

 

Mistresses (TV series)
South Korean television series based on British television series
OCN television dramas
Korean-language television shows
2018 South Korean television series debuts
2018 South Korean television series endings
South Korean mystery television series
South Korean thriller television series
South Korean television series remade in other languages
Television series by Studio Dragon
Television series by Chorokbaem Media